Agrilus lecontei, or Leconte's Brownsville buprestid, is a species of metallic wood-boring beetle in the family Buprestidae. It is found in North America.

Subspecies
These two subspecies belong to the species Agrilus lecontei:
 Agrilus lecontei celticola Fisher, 1928
 Agrilus lecontei lecontei Saunders, 1871

References

Further reading

External links

 

lecontei
Articles created by Qbugbot
Beetles described in 1871